Joseph Carl Hietpas (born May 1, 1979) is a United States former Major League Baseball player. Hietpas attended Northwestern University, Illinois.

In 2004, Hietpas was called up to the New York Mets once the roster expanded in September. He suffered an injury during batting practice one day, which forced him to be able to only play in one game, October 3, 2004, against the Montreal Expos. He came into the game as a ninth inning substitute for Todd Zeile. Because the Mets won the game, 8–1, the bottom half of the final inning was never played, and Hietpas did not receive an at-bat. In that game, he was a catcher, but after the 2006 season, converted to pitcher.

In 2007, he appeared in 27 games and had a 2.47 ERA for the High-A St. Lucie Mets. Hietpas played his final season of baseball for the Double-A Binghamton Mets in 2008. He later became a real estate lawyer based in St. Louis, Missouri.

References

External links

1979 births
Living people
Baseball players from Wisconsin
Major League Baseball catchers
Northwestern Wildcats baseball players
St. Lucie Mets players
Norfolk Tides players
New York Mets players
Binghamton Mets players
Sportspeople from Appleton, Wisconsin
Missouri lawyers
Brooklyn Cyclones players
Capital City Bombers players
Kingsport Mets players
Peoria Saguaros players
Washington University School of Law alumni